Aa is a river of North Rhine-Westphalia, Germany.

The source of Aa is in the village of Altenbüren. From here it flows in an easterly direction. Nearby the Hillbringse flows in from the south. Half a kilometer farther are five former mills in Aatal, called Aamühlen. The Fülsenbecke flows in near here from the north.

See also
List of rivers of North Rhine-Westphalia

Rivers of North Rhine-Westphalia
Rivers of Germany